Pan Wei (born 11 June 1978) is a Chinese former basketball player who competed in the 2004 Summer Olympics.

References

1978 births
Living people
Basketball players from Liaoning
Olympic basketball players of China
Basketball players at the 2004 Summer Olympics
People from Fuxin
Asian Games medalists in basketball
Basketball players at the 1998 Asian Games
Basketball players at the 2002 Asian Games
Chinese women's basketball players
Asian Games gold medalists for China
Asian Games silver medalists for China
Medalists at the 1998 Asian Games
Medalists at the 2002 Asian Games
Guangdong Vermilion Birds players
Chinese women's basketball coaches
21st-century Chinese women